The Armbruster Rocks are exposed rocks on the west side of Wright Island,  southwest of Cape Felt, off the Bakutis Coast, Marie Byrd Land in Antarctica. They were mapped by the United States Geological Survey from surveys and from U.S. Navy aerial photographs, 1959–67, and were named by the Advisory Committee on Antarctic Names after Lieutenant Robert B. Armbruster, a U.S. Navy Communications Officer at Christchurch, New Zealand, Operation Deep Freeze, 1963 and 1964.

References 

Rock formations of Marie Byrd Land